Tamaulipasaurus is an extinct genus of lepidosauromorph reptile from the Early Jurassic of Mexico. It contains a single species, Tamaulipasaurus morenoi, which is based on skull material found at Huizachal Canyon, a productive fossil site in the La Boca Formation. Tamaulipasaurus had an unusual condensed skull similar to that of amphisbaenians, a modern group of burrowing squamates. It also possessed a variety of plesiomorphic ("primitive") skull features indicating that it was not a true squamate. Nevertheless, other traits do support a position close to squamates, within the broader reptile group Lepidosauromorpha.

References 

Jurassic reptiles of North America
Jurassic lepidosauromorphs
Fossil taxa described in 1994
Prehistoric reptile genera